Islamia Park (Punjabi, Islamia Bagh) is a neighbourhood located within union council 89 (Bahawalpur) in Samanabad Town of Lahore, Punjab, Pakistan. The neighbourhood is located near Chauburji.

Samanabad Zone